We Bought a Zoo is a 2011 film directed by Cameron Crowe.

We Bought a Zoo may also refer to:

 We Bought a Zoo (book), a book by Benjamin Mee
 "WWE Bought a ZOO", a parody episode from the animated TV series Mad